Ponikve pri Studencu is a small settlement northeast of Studenec in the Municipality of Sevnica in east-central Slovenia. It lies in the hills above the right bank of the Sava River in an area that traditionally belonged to Lower Carniola. The municipality is now included in the Lower Sava Statistical Region.

Name
The name of the settlement was changed from Ponikve to Ponikve pri Studencu in 1953.

References

External links
Ponikve pri Studencu at Geopedia

Populated places in the Municipality of Sevnica